Navjot Kaur (born 10 February 1990) is an Indian wrestler. She represented India in the women's freestyle 67 kg category at the 2014 Commonwealth Games in Glasgow in which she won the bronze medal. She became the first Indian woman wrestler to win an Asian Championship gold medal.

Career

2011 Asian Wrestling Championships 
At the tournament in Tashkent, Uzbekistan, Navjot faced Banzyaragzh Oyunsuren of Mongolia in the semi-finals of the women's freestyle 67 kg category and lost 3:1. She then contested the bronze medal match against Yuanyuan Wang of China and won the bronze medal, beating her Chinese opponent 5:0.

2013 Wrestling World Cup 
In the Wrestling World Cup held in Ulan-Baatar, Mongolia, Navjot finished third and won the bronze medal in the women's freestyle 67 kg category.

2013 Asian Wrestling Championships 
At the tournament in New Delhi, India, Navjot faced Hyekung Ham of South Korea in the semi-finals of the women's freestyle 67 kg category and won 3:1. She then qualified for the gold medal bout against Nasanburmaa Ochirbat of Mongolia but lost 1:3 to settle for the silver medal.

2014 Commonwealth Games 
Competing in the women's freestyle 69 kg category, Navjot faced Dori Yeats of Canada in the semi-finals and lost 4:0 to her. But she was able to compete in the bronze medal bout and won the bronze medal, beating home favourite Sarah Jones of Scotland 4:0.

Pro Wrestling League 
Navjot is one of the two Indian female wrestlers bought by the Bangalore franchise (owned by JSW Sport) of the Pro Wrestling League.

The Pro Wrestling League was scheduled to be held from 10 to 27 December across 6 cities.

Other titles 
 Dave Schultz Memorial Tournament, 2010 - 6th place

See also 
 Official FILA page of Navjot Kaur

References

Living people
1990 births
21st-century Indian women
21st-century Indian people
Indian female sport wrestlers
Sport wrestlers from Punjab, India
Commonwealth Games bronze medallists for India
Wrestlers at the 2014 Commonwealth Games
Commonwealth Games medallists in wrestling
Asian Wrestling Championships medalists
Medallists at the 2014 Commonwealth Games